Klapperichella is a genus of ground beetles in the family Carabidae. There are at least two described species in Klapperichella.

Species
These two species belong to the genus Klapperichella:
 Klapperichella afganistana Jedlicka, 1956  (Afghanistan)
 Klapperichella melanoxantha Kryzhanovskij, 1993  (China)

References

Platyninae